Acompsoceras is an extinct genus of cephalopod belonging to the Ammonite subclass. It grew to a large size compared to most ammonites. Its shell reached  in diameter when the animal reached adulthood. Acompsoceras appears in the fossil record during the early portion of the Cretaceous Cenomanian stage and goes extinct around the middle of that same stage.

Species 
Acompsoceras is in the same family as Acanthoceras, the Acanthoceratidae, and contains several species:
 A. amphibolum
 A. calabarense
 A. essendiense
 A. inconstans
 A. renevieri

Distribution 
Fossils of Acompsoceras have been found in Brazil, Colombia (Hiló Formation), Germany, Madagascar, Nigeria, the United Kingdom and Texas.

References 

Cretaceous ammonites
Acanthoceratidae
Ammonitida genera
Ammonites of South America
Cretaceous Colombia
Albian life
Cenomanian life